The 1968 Norwegian Football Cup was the 63rd season of the Norwegian annual knockout football tournament. The Final was held on 27 October 1968, between Lyn and Mjøndalen. Lyn won their eighth Norwegian Cup. Having won the league, Lyn qualified for the 1969–70 European Cup, with Mjøndalen qualifying for the 1969–70 European Cup Winners' Cup as runners-up.

First round

{{OneLegResult|Nordnes||0–0 |Årstad}}

 

|-
|colspan="3" style="background-color:#97DEFF"|Replay

|}

Second round

 

|-
|colspan="3" style="background-color:#97DEFF"|Replay

|-
|colspan="3" style="background-color:#97DEFF"|2nd replay

|-
|colspan="3" style="background-color:#97DEFF"|3rd replay

|}

Third round

|colspan="3" style="background-color:#97DEFF"|30 June 1968|-
|colspan="3" style="background-color:#97DEFF"|7 July 1968|-
|colspan="3" style="background-color:#97DEFF"|Replay: 4 July 1968|-
|colspan="3" style="background-color:#97DEFF"|Replay: 7 July 1968|}

Fourth round

|colspan="3" style="background-color:#97DEFF"|4 August 1968|-
|colspan="3" style="background-color:#97DEFF"|Replay: 11 August 1968|}

Quarter-finals

|colspan="3" style="background-color:#97DEFF"|1 September 1968|}

Semi-finals

|colspan="3" style="background-color:#97DEFF"|29 September 1968'''

|}

Final

Lyn's winning squad

 Svein Bjørn Olsen
 Jan Rodvang
 Helge Østvold
 Andreas Morisbak
 Knut Kolle
 Knut Berg
 Karl Johan Johannessen
 Jan Berg
 Harald Berg
 Ola Dybwad-Olsen
 Jon Palmer Austnes
 Alf H. Braathen
 Trygve Christophersen 
 Sveinung Aarnseth

References
www.rsssf.no

Norwegian Football Cup seasons
Norway
Football Cup